Saint-Liboire (or Saint-Liboire-de-Bagot) is a municipality in the municipalité régionale de comté des Maskoutains in Québec, Canada, located in the administrative region of Montérégie. The population as of the 2011 Canadian Census was 3,051.

History
Before the foundation of Saint-Liboire, the actual town territory was included in the Seigneurie de Ramezay given to Claude de Ramezay near 1710.

The village municipality was founded in 1857 with the purpose to offer more arable lands to the Catholic colonists coming from the Saint-Hyacinthe region.

It became the chief town of Bagot County.

Reading suggestion
The book Centenaire de Saint-Liboire, 20-24 juin 1957 : album-souvenir, 1857-1957 written by Dollard Boucher and Armand Laliberté, and is available at the Bibliothèque et Archives nationales du Québec.

Demographics

Population

Language

See also
List of municipalities in Quebec

References

External links

 KMZ File working] with Google Earth.
Information on Saint-Liboire
Details on the town
Photos of the Saint-Patrice Street (July 2003), Patrice Marcotte
Page on Quebec Municipal

Municipalities in Quebec
Incorporated places in Les Maskoutains Regional County Municipality
Designated places in Quebec
1857 establishments in Canada